Softlogic Holdings PLC is a diversified conglomerate in Sri Lanka engaged in ICT, healthcare, retail, financial services, automobiles and leisure.

History
Softlogic began as a software development company in 1991 by Ashok Pathirage and twelve employees. The company later successfully obtained the Dell authorised distributorship in Sri Lanka. Softlogic ventured into the telecommunications sector with a partnership with Dialog Axiata offering corporate and individual Dialog GSM packages. Pathirage who realised the potential of mobile communications acquired the national dealership of Nokia in the year 2000. Softlogic went through a period of aggressive growth between 2006 and 2009 where they entered the retail sector with the acquisition of Uni Walkers (Pvt) Ltd. Softlogic which had begun to diversify entering retail and lifestyle sectors opened furniture stores and showrooms islandwide. Softlogic became the authorised dealer for Panasonic, Samsung, Nokia, Dell, Apple, Candy, Russell Hobbs, Kelvinator adding the brand names within its fold of Consumer Electronics. The branded apparel sector was also growing with the authorised distributor status for the jeanswear brand ‘Levis’ in 2009.

Later Softlogic acquired and renovated Ceysands Hotels and Resorts jointly with Centara chain of Hotels. They also acquired Asiri group of hospitals as well as a large stake in the retail chain ODEL and built a 5-star 24-storey hotel with Movenpick in Colombo.

Sectors

Healthcare
Softlogic Holdings is represented in the healthcare sector by Asiri Health chain of hospitals.

Retail
 Consumer Electronics 
 Branded Apparels - Galleria, ODEL
 Furniture  
 Restaurants - Burger King, Baskin Robbins, Crystal Jade, Popeyes, Delifrance 
 Softlogic Glomark Supermarkets  
 Agora Super Stores - Bangladesh

Financial
 Softlogic Finance PLC
 Softlogic Life Insurance PLC 
 Softlogic Stockbrokers (Pvt) Ltd

ICT
 Softlogic Information Technologies
 Softlogic Computers
 Softlogic Communications
 Softlogic International
 Office Automation
 Softlogic Australia
 Softlogic Mobile Distribution

Automobile
 Softlogic Automobiles
 Future Automobile

Leisure
 Abacus International Lanka
 Centara Ceysands Resort & Spa 
 Movenpick City Hotel

Sports
Softlogic Holdings bought the ownership of Colombo Stars franchise ahead of the 2021 Lanka Premier League.

References 

Conglomerate companies of Sri Lanka
Conglomerate companies established in 1991
Companies listed on the Colombo Stock Exchange
Sri Lankan companies established in 1991